Calum Forrester (born 3 October 1986) is a Scottish rugby union coach who formerly played professionally for Glasgow Warriors. He also played for the Scotland 7s and Scotland A national teams.

Early life
Forrester attended Hutchesons Grammar School. He had two years at Glasgow University studying sports science and also enrolled in the Open University. Forrester was a member of Scottish Rugby's National Rugby Academy and has a Duke of Edinburgh Silver Award.

International career
Forrester was a member of the Scotland Sevens squad for the 2004 Commonwealth Youth Games in Bendigo, Australia. He made his national team debut during  the 2005–06 IRB Sevens World Series, playing in the 2006 London Sevens and Edinburgh Sevens tournaments. He played in four tournaments for the 2006–07 series and, after being selected to play for the Rugby Ecosse at the Singapore Sevens in October 2007, he continued in the Scotland squad for the 2007 tournaments in Dubai and George.

He represented Scotland at the 2005 IRB Under 19 World Championship, playing in all the team's matches at Durban in South Africa. Forrester also played for Scotland at the under-21 World Championship in 2006, joining the squad after the pool stage as a replacement for injured player Johnnie Beattie, and played as a substitute in the 46–14 win against Georgia in Issoire.

Forrester played for Scotland A, as part of the team that won the 2009 IRB Nations Cup in Romania.

Domestic career
Forester joined professional side the Glasgow Warriors in 2006, but  continued to play at Glasgow Hutchesons Aloysians (GHA) until 2008, before being selected to join Ayr RFC in August of that year, where he played until 2014.

He made his Celtic League debut for the Warriors as a replacement in the away match against the Cardiff Blues in September 2006. Forrester was played for the Warriors over a six-season span up to the 2011–12 season.

He was also in the Scottish Thistles squad who won the Melrose club's 125th anniversary sevens in April 2008.

Coaching
Following two years as club captain at Ayr RFC, Forrester took up the head coach position at the club in 2014. He won the BT Premiership in 2017 with a 12–8 victory over Melrose in the Grand Final.

References

1986 births
Living people
Alumni of the Open University
Alumni of the University of Glasgow
Ayr RFC players
Glasgow Hutchesons Aloysians RFC players
Glasgow Warriors players
Male rugby sevens players
Rugby union flankers
Rugby union players from Glasgow
Scotland international rugby sevens players
Scottish rugby union players